Md. Akhtaruzzaman is a Bangladeshi academic who is the current and the 28th vice-chancellor of the University of Dhaka. Prior to this position, he served in different academic, administrative and co-curricular development activities at the University of Dhaka including the pro-vice chancellor (administration), dean (Faculty of Arts), chairman, Department of Islamic History & Culture, and provost of the Kabi Jashim Uddin Hall, University of Dhaka.

Early life and education
Md. Akhtaruzzaman, the second son of Eron Banu and Abul Hashem Khan (the freedom fighters of Bangladesh in 1971), was born in Kalipur of Patharghata in Barguna. He earned Doctor of Philosophy (Ph.D.) in history from the prestigious Aligarh Muslim University in 1997. He was a Fulbright Scholar at Boston College, in the United States, where he researched "Religions in American Public Life". As a British Council Scholar at the Center for Christian Muslim Relations, Department of Theology and Religion, University of Birmingham, England, Akhtaruzzaman studied "Muslim Communities in United Kingdom". Akhtaruzzaman has a post-graduate diploma in Persian language, and completed Bachelor of Arts (honours) and Master of Arts (M.A.) in Islamic History & Culture (IHC) from the University of Dhaka, securing first position in both the academic programs. In his student life he was a resident student of Masterda Surjasen Hall at the University of Dhaka.

Professional activities 
Akhtaruzzaman led the National Committee for Textbook Crisis Resolution formed by the Government of Bangladesh in 2009 as convener. This committee recommended for free distribution of textbooks for students up to class ten, and suggested reforms in printing and supplying textbooks. He was the Convener of Textbook Printing and Distribution Oversee and Advisory Committee (2009 & 2010), Member of National Education Policy 2010 Implementation Committee and Member, National Curriculum Coordination Committee (NCCC). He has been elected as a council member of the Association of Commonwealth Universities (ACU)  following a competitive selection process.

Quota reform and attack on house
A group of terrorist attacked and vandalized the historic Vice Chancellor's house of the University of Dhaka on 9 April 2018 at around 1-2:20am, and destroyed doors, windows and glasses historic furniture of the building, looted valuable belongings and historic artifacts, and burned car, households and many other materials. The attack took place while the movement for "Quota Reform" in the public service recruitment examination was happening at the University Campus.  Masked attackers verbally abused and tried to attack the vice chancellor. Later, a group of students along with some teachers protested the attack and rescued the vice chancellor.

There has been some controversy regarding the attack on 9 April as one opposition party leader alleged that the attack was carried out to divert the quota-reform movement to different direction.

On 11 April 2018 when Prime Minister of Bangladesh Sheikh Hasina announced in the parliament that all sorts of quota will be scrapped from public service,   Akhtaruzzaman also expressed solidarity with the Quota Reform Movement. However, on 8 July 2018, during the second phase of Quota Reform Protests, he compared the mode of activities of quota reform protesters with that of Islamist militant outfits, which was questioned by human rights activists and international political analysts. Following the agitations of students, Akhtaruzzaman ordered a bar on the entry of general people to Dhaka University campus which was criticized heavily by the Supreme Court Bar Association of Bangladesh.

Works
Akhtaruzzaman has written 42 research articles in journals and edited books. He has authored / edited the following  books.
 Muslim Itihastattwa (Muslim Historiography / মুসলিম ইতিহাসতত্ত্ব) (Dhaka University, 2008; second edition July 2019)
 Society and Urbanization in Medieval Bengal (Asiatic Society of Bangladesh, 2009; first reprint 2020)
 Liberation War of Bangladesh : Background and Event (edited, 2009)
 A Quest for Islamic Learning: Essays in Memory of Professor Serajul Haque (edited, 2011)
 Probandha Sankolon (Anthology of Essays) (edited)
 Islam and Moral Studies (edited, textbooks for class VI - X)
 Bangladesh and Global Studies (edited & moderated, textbook for class IX - X)

References

Living people
People from Barguna district
University of Dhaka alumni
Academic staff of the University of Dhaka
Aligarh Muslim University alumni
Vice-Chancellors of the University of Dhaka
Year of birth missing (living people)